Herbert Shaw (born 1919) was an English professional footballer who played as a winger.

References

1919 births
Footballers from Sheffield
English footballers
Association football wingers
Broadway Amateurs F.C. players
Dronfield Town F.C. players
Boston United F.C. players
Grimsby Town F.C. players
Chelmsford City F.C. players
English Football League players
Possibly living people